Johannes Schraps (born 17 August 1983) is a German politician. Born in Bad Pyrmont, Lower Saxony, he represents the SPD. Johannes Schraps has served as a member of the Bundestag from the state of Lower Saxony since 2017.

Life 
He became member of the bundestag after the 2017 German federal election. He is a member of the Committee on European Union Affairs.

He was re-elected at the 2021 German federal election.

References

External links 

  
 Bundestag biography 

1983 births
Living people
Members of the Bundestag for Lower Saxony
Members of the Bundestag 2021–2025
Members of the Bundestag 2017–2021
Members of the Bundestag for the Social Democratic Party of Germany